Daniel Goh Ji Xiong (born 13 August 1999) is a Singaporean professional footballer who plays midfielder for Singapore Premier League club Balestier Khalsa.

Club career

Hougang United
Daniel signed with Hougang United's prime league squad in 2018, and was later promoted to the first team, he made 3 appearances for the club in the 2018 Singapore Premier League.

Balestier Khalsa
Daniel then signed with Balestier Khalsa for the 2019 campaign and became a regular starter for the club. He made his debut on 9 March 2019, against his former club Hougang United.

Albirex Niigata
Daniel then signed with Albirex Niigata Singapore FC to play in the 2020 season as one of the lightning fast players from his former club Balestier Khalsa FC.

International career
Daniel was first called up to the Singapore under-22 in 2019 for the 2019 Merlion Cup. Daniel made his debut and his first start for the under-22s on 7 June 2019, against Philippines. Daniel recorded an assist on his debut, providing the pass for Ikhsan Fandi to score.

Career statistics

Club

International statistics

U23 International caps

U23 International goals
Scores and results list Singapore's goal tally first.

U19 International caps

Honours

Club

Albirex Niigata (S) 

 Singapore Premier League: 2020

International
Singapore U22
 Merlion Cup: 2019

References

1999 births
Living people
Singaporean footballers
Singapore international footballers
Singapore Premier League players
Singaporean sportspeople of Chinese descent
Association football midfielders
Hougang United FC players
Balestier Khalsa FC players
Singapore youth international footballers